The 1966–67 Georgetown Hoyas men's basketball team represented Georgetown University during the 1966–67 NCAA University Division college basketball season. John Magee coached them in his first season as head coach. The team was an independent and played its home games at McDonough Gymnasium on the Georgetown campus in Washington, D.C.

After the departure of Georgetown head coach Tommy O'Keefe at the end of the previous season, no college head coach or assistant coach applied for the job. Boston College head coach Bob Cousy recommended Magee, the head coach of Catholic Memorial School in Boston, Massachusetts. Georgetown hired Magee, who would go on to coach the Hoyas for six seasons.

Season recap

Junior guard Dennis Cesar, an expert in shooting free throws, shot 12-for-16 from the field at Canisius. In the two games of the Kodak Classic in late December 1966, he scored a combined 40 points against Purdue and Dartmouth. Shortly after that, he had a 28-point game against Saint Peter's. A shoulder injury reduced his performance later in the year but did not stop him from scoring in double figures in all but two games this season.

Senior forward Steve Sullivan played in all 23 games and scored in double figures in 21 of them, scoring 20 or more points ten times. In the season opener, he scored 33 points and pulled down 17 rebounds against American; later in the year he had 26 points and 23 rebounds against Syracuse, and in the last home game of the year, he had an 18-point, 16-rebound effort against Seton Hall. For the season, he averaged 12 rebounds per game, a school record at the time.

Senior center Frank Hollendoner frequently got into foul trouble, but he shot 69% from the field and averaged 11.1 points per game for the season. He scored 22 points against Purdue and scored 15 points and had 15 rebounds against Navy.

Sophomore forward Jim Supple joined the varsity team after a high-scoring season with the freshman team the previous year. He played in all 23 games and, although he often got in foul trouble, he scored in double figures in 15 of them. His season high was a 23-point performance against Boston College.

In the 1964-65 season, Georgetown had started strong, raising hopes for a post-season tournament berth, but lost seven of its final 10 games to drop out of consideration for the post-season. Two years later, the 1966-67 Hoyas followed a similar pattern, starting 9-3 but losing eight of their final 11 games to finish with a record of 12-11 and no post-season play. The team was not ranked in the Top 20 of the Associated Press Poll or Coaches' Poll at any time.

Roster
From the 1958-59 season through the 1967-68 season, Georgetown players wore even-numbered jerseys for home games and odd-numbered ones for away games; for example, a player would wear No. 10 at home and No. 11 on the road. Players are listed below by the even numbers they wore at home.

Guard Bernard White joined the team this season as the first African-American recruit in Georgetown men's basketball history. He had played for George Mason University the previous season, but George Mason's men's basketball program did not receive National Collegiate Athletic Association (NCAA) recognition until 1967, so White retained the then-maximum three years of NCAA varsity eligibility when he joined the Hoyas.

Source

Rankings

The team was not ranked in the Top 20 in the Associated Press Poll at any time.

1966–67 schedule and results

Sources

|-
!colspan=9 style="background:#002147; color:#8D817B;"| Regular Season

References

Georgetown Hoyas men's basketball seasons
Georgetown
Georgetown Hoyas men's basketball team
Georgetown Hoyas men's basketball team